Stary Puznów  is a village in the administrative district of Gmina Garwolin, within Garwolin County, Masovian Voivodeship, in east-central Poland.

References

Villages in Garwolin County